Mihai Gruia Sandu (born 1956) is a Romanian actor, playwright and director.

Filmography 
 Sherlock: Case of Evil
 The Rest Is Silence (2007 film)
 Too Late (1996 film)
 Teen Knight
 Gruber's Journey
 Incubus
 Blood & Chocolate (film)
 Rio - Nigel (Romanian version) / 20th Century Fox

References

External links 
 Mihai Gruia Sandu: „Au fost ani superbi în care am făcut nişte copilării fericite“

1956 births
Living people
Romanian actors
Romanian directors